Circle packing in a right isosceles triangle is a packing problem where the objective is to pack  unit circles into the smallest possible isosceles right triangle.

Minimum solutions (lengths shown are length of leg) are shown in the table below.

References

Circle packing